Elías Oyarzún (born 11 December 1988) is a Chilean handball player for Balónmano Ovalle and the Chilean national team.

He participated at the 2019 World Men's Handball Championship.

References

1988 births
Living people
Chilean male handball players
South American Games bronze medalists for Chile
South American Games medalists in handball
Competitors at the 2018 South American Games
Pan American Games medalists in handball
Pan American Games silver medalists for Chile
Handball players at the 2019 Pan American Games
Medalists at the 2019 Pan American Games
20th-century Chilean people
21st-century Chilean people